Ann-Sofie Järnström (born 16 July 1949) is a former ice speed skater from Sweden, who represented her native country at three consecutive Winter Olympics, starting in 1972 in Sapporo, Japan. She had her best results in 1980, when she finished fourth over 500 m and eighth over 1000 m.

References

External links
 SkateResults

1949 births
Living people
Swedish female speed skaters
Speed skaters at the 1972 Winter Olympics
Speed skaters at the 1976 Winter Olympics
Speed skaters at the 1980 Winter Olympics
Olympic speed skaters of Sweden
Place of birth missing (living people)